Reema Dodin is an American political advisor serving as the deputy director of the White House Office of Legislative Affairs in the Biden administration. Upon taking office, she became the highest ranking Palestinian-American woman to serve in the Executive Office of the President of the United States. She is the former deputy chief of staff and floor director for U.S. Senator Dick Durbin.

Early life and education

Reema Dodin was born in North Carolina. Her parents, Bajis and Samia Dodin, are Palestinian. Dodin's parents immigrated to the United States in the 1970s from Dura, Hebron in the West Bank. Her grandfather is Mustafa Dodin, a social affairs minister in Jordan who was involved Israeli-Palestinian peace negotiations in the 1970s.

Dodin earned her Bachelor of Arts from the University of California, Berkeley in political science and economics in 2002. While there, she participated in social justice and public health work. In 2006, Dodin interned in Senator Dick Durbin's office. That same year, she earned her Juris Doctor from the University of Illinois at Urbana–Champaign.

Career

Dodin returned to work for Senator Dick Durbin after graduation in the fall of 2006. Her early years with Durbin were spent as an aide for the United States Senate Committee on the Judiciary's  subcommittee on human rights. Dodin’s latter years were spent in his leadership whip office, as counsel, then director, and then as his deputy chief of staff, managing his whip and floor operations. His farewell address for her noted her contributions to several major legislative items. 

Dodin volunteered as voter protection counsel through several elections. She volunteered for President  Barack Obama's  2008 presidential campaign focusing on voter rights and for Hillary Clinton's 2016 presidential campaign. She has also volunteered as voting rights counsel for several senate campaigns including those of Senator Joe Donnelly and Senator Jon Tester.

In 2017, she co-authored Inside Congress: A Guide for Navigating the Politics of the House and Senate Floors published by the Brookings Institution. 

Ms. Dodin served as a Term Member on the Council of Foreign Relations. She is also a fellow for the Truman National Security Project and the New Leaders Council. 

In November 2020, Dodin began working, as a volunteer, on the presidential transition of Joe Biden, overseeing legislative engagement between the transition and Capitol Hill on nominations.

Dodin was named Deputy Director of the White House Office of Legislative Affairs, alongside Shuwanza Goff, for the Biden administration in November 2020. Her role in the Biden administration makes her the highest ranking Palestinian-American woman to serve in the Executive Office of the President of the United States.

Personal life 
Dodin is the oldest of four siblings. She grew up in Southern California, and has resided mainly in Washington DC since the end of 2006.

Works
Dodin served as the Executive Producer of the short film "Tallahassee." It premiered at the Blackstar Film Festival in Philadelphia in August, 2021, and is a New Yorker Magazine Screening Room Film.
Along side Trevor Corning and Kyle Nevins, Dodin is the co-author of Inside Congress: A Guide for Navigating the Politics of the House and Senate Floors published by the Brookings Institution in 2017.

References

External links
Dick Durbin's tribute to Reema Dodin on C-SPAN

Biden administration personnel
American politicians of Palestinian descent
21st-century American non-fiction writers
American writers of Palestinian descent
American people of Jordanian descent
American Sunni Muslims
Palestinian Muslim activists
21st-century American women writers
American women non-fiction writers
United States congressional aides
University of California, Berkeley alumni
University of Illinois College of Law alumni
Year of birth missing (living people)
Living people